Skip Frye (born Harry Richard Frye; September 7, 1941 in San Diego, California) is an American surfer, surfboard designer and shaper, and environmental activist.

Background
Frye attended Mission Bay High School and began his professional surfing career in 1958. His first board was a balsa board shaped by legend Mike Diffenderfer. He rode professionally for G&S surfboards and eventually created his own model for them in 1967. He captured national titles and represented the United States team internationally in 1966. Frye has appeared on many magazine covers including Sports Illustrated Swimsuit Issue (1969, with model Jamee Becker), The Surfer's Journal, Surfing, and Surfer Magazine.

Frye is known for his gliding, fluid style as well as creating some of the most in-demand surfboards in the world. He is perhaps, best recognized by his iconic logo, a set of wings commonly referred to as "Frye Wings." After hitting a rough financial patch in the 70s, he started signing his wings in pencil because he could't afford laminates. This is referred to as his "ghetto days", when he shaped surfboards behind Select Surf Shop in Pacific Beach. Iconic images of him surfing with his dog, silhouetted against a setting sun, and paddling alone into "The Ranch" have appeared in books and magazines and have been printed on clothing and surfboards. Frye is also known for his innovation with foiled surfboard fins.  After a surfing trip to Australia in 1969, he developed his trademark board shapes: the Egg, the Fish, and specialized longboard shapes. He has developed a moderate temperature surf wax ("Man Wax"), ideal for his native San Diego waters.

Frye is a 2011 inductee into the Surfing Walk of Fame in Huntington Beach, California in the surf pioneer category.

In May, 2017 Frye was presented with the Lifetime Achievement Award at the San Diego Surf Film Festival.

Personal
Frye married his first wife, Marcia Metcalf, in 1963. Together, they raised their three children (Lauren - from a previous marriage, Donald - from a previous marriage, and Braden) before divorcing.

In 1990, Frye married his long-time girlfriend Donna Frye (née Sarvis), and they started Harry's Surf Shop with Harry "Hank" Warner. His wife was elected as a San Diego City Councilmember in 2001 and narrowly lost the San Diego mayoral election in 2005. Her term ended on December 6, 2010. They founded Surfers Tired of Pollution in the mid 1990s and are both public supporters of clean water and the environment.

References

External links
 Skip Frye Surfboards - official site

1941 births
Living people
American surfers
Surfboard shapers
People from San Diego